This is a list of the stations on the Bucharest Metro rapid transit system in Bucharest, Romania. There are 63 stations in the Bucharest Metro.

Current Lines
 Line 1: Dristor 2 — Pantelimon
 Line 2: Pipera — Berceni
 Line 3: Preciziei — Anghel Saligny
 Line 4: Străulești — Gara de Nord 2
 Line 5: Râul Doamnei/Valea Ialomiței — Eroilor 2

Stations
For each of the 63 stations, the list reports the lines serving it,  the opening year and the statistics of passenger usage; the English translation of the name (in quotes) and other names previously used (in italics) are listed, where available, in the second last column. Interchange (i) and terminal stations (t) are in bold.

Extensions

M2 (blue line)

Opened in 1986, Line M2 is the busiest line crossing the city in the north–south direction, from Pipera to Berceni. An extension toward the Bucharest South Ring Road is under construction.

 Tudor Arghezi

M4 (green line)

Line M4, opened in 2000, currently runs from Gara de Nord to Străulești in the city's northwest. A southward extension to Gara Progresul railway station is under study, with a view to starting construction works in the near future.

 Știrbei Vodă
 Hașdeu (transfer: Metro M5)
 Uranus
 George Rozorea
 Chirigiu
 Filaret
 Eroii Revoluției (transfer: Metro M2)
 George Bacovia
 Toporași
 Nicolae Cajal
 Luică
 Giurgiului
 Gara Progresul

M5 (orange line)

Line M5 is the newest line, opened in 2020 from Eroilor to Râul Doamnei and Valea Ialomiței in the city's southwest. A two-stage extension to Piața Iancului and further to Pantelimon is planned, due to open in 2023 and 2030 respectively.

 Hașdeu
 Cișmigiu
 Universitate (transfer: Metro M2)
 Calea Moșilor
 Traian
 Piața Iancului (transfer: Metro M1)
 Victor Manu
 Arena Națională
 Chișinău
 Morarilor
 Sfântul Pantelimon
 Vergului (transfer: Metro M1 at Pantelimon)

M6 (pink line)

Line M6 is designed to connect two important transportation hubs: the Gara de Nord railway station and the Henri Coandă International Airport in Otopeni, passing near Băneasa railway station and Aurel Vlaicu International Airport.

 Gara de Nord  (transfer: Metro M1, CFR station)
 Basarab  (transfer: Metro M1, CFR station)
 Grivița 
 1 Mai 
 Pajura
 Expoziției
 Piața Montreal
 Gara Băneasa (transfer: CFR station)
 Aeroportul Băneasa
 Tokyo
 Washington
 Paris
 Bruxelles
 Otopeni
 Ion I. C. Brătianu
 Aeroportul Otopeni

Notes

Lists of metro stations
Metro
 
Metro stations, Bucharest
Metro stations